Lavinia Wilson (born 8 March 1980) is a German actress. She has appeared in more than sixty films since 1992.

Selected filmography

References

External links 

1980 births
Living people
German film actresses